System of systems engineering (SoSE) is a set of developing processes, tools, and methods for designing, re-designing and deploying solutions to system-of-systems challenges.

Overview 
System of Systems Engineering (SoSE) methodology is heavily used in U.S. Department of Defense applications, but is increasingly being applied to non-defense related problems such as architectural design of problems in air and auto transportation, healthcare, global communication networks, search and rescue, space exploration, industry 4.0 and many other System of Systems application domains. SoSE is more than systems engineering of monolithic, complex systems because design for System-of-Systems problems is performed under some level of uncertainty in the requirements and the constituent systems, and it involves considerations in multiple levels and domains. Whereas systems engineering focuses on building the system right, SoSE focuses on choosing the right system(s) and their interactions to satisfy the requirements.

System-of-Systems Engineering and Systems Engineering are related but different fields of study. Whereas systems engineering addresses the development and operations of monolithic products, SoSE addresses the development and operations of evolving programs. In other words, traditional systems engineering seeks to optimize an individual system (i.e., the product), while SoSE seeks to optimize network of various interacting legacy and new systems brought together to satisfy multiple objectives of the program.  SoSE should enable the decision-makers to understand the implications of various choices on technical performance, costs, extensibility and flexibility over time; thus, effective SoSE methodology should prepare decision-makers to design informed architectural solutions for System-of-Systems problems.

Due to varied methodology and domains of applications in existing literature, there does not exist a single unified consensus for processes involved in System-of-Systems Engineering.  One of the proposed SoSE frameworks, by Dr. Daniel A. DeLaurentis, recommends a three-phase method where a SoS problem is defined (understood), abstracted, modeled and analyzed for behavioral patterns. More information on this method and other proposed methods can be found in the listed SoSE focused organizations and SoSE literature in the subsequent sections.

See also 
 Enterprise systems engineering
 System of systems
 Enterprise architecture

References

Further reading 
 Kenneth Cureton, F. Stan Settlers, "System-of-Systems Architecting: Educational Findings and Implications," 2005 IEEE International Conference on Systems, Man and Cybernetics, Waikoloa, Hawaii, October 10–12, 2005. pp. 2726–2731.
 Mo Jamshidi, "System-of-Systems Engineering — A Definition," IEEE SMC 2005, Big Island, Hawaii, URL: http://ieeesmc2005.unm.edu/SoSE_Defn.htm
 Saurabh Mittal, Jose L. Risco Martin, "Netcentric System of Systems Engineering with DEVS Unified Process", CRC Press, Boca Raton, Florida, 2013 URL:http://www.crcpress.com/product/isbn/9781439827062
 Charles Keating, Ralph Rogers, Resit Unal, David Dryer, et al.  "System of Systems Engineering," Engineering Management Journal, Vol. 15, no. 3, pp. 36.
 Charles Keating, "Research Foundations for System of Systems Engineering," 2005 IEEE International Conference on Systems, Man and Cybernetics, Waikoloa, Hawaii, October 10–12, 2005. pp. 2720–2725.
 Jack Ring, Azad Madni, "Key Challenges and Opportunities in 'System of Systems' Engineering," 2005 IEEE International Conference on Systems, Man and Cybernetics, Waikoloa, Hawaii, October 10–12, 2005. pp. 973–978.
 R.E. Raygan, "Configuration management in a system-of-systems environment delivering IT services," 2007 IEEE International Engineering Management Conference, Austin, Texas, July 29, 2007-Aug, 1 2007. pp. 330 – 335.
 D. Luzeaux & JR Ruault, "Systems of Systems", ISTE Ltd and John Wiley & Sons Inc, 2010
 D. Luzeaux, JR Ruault & JL Wippler, "Complex System and Systems of Systems Engineering", ISTE Ltd and John Wiley & Sons Inc, 2011

External links 
 System of Systems Signature Area at Purdue University's College of Engineering (Apr 2015 - content no longer specific to System of Systems)
 National Centers for System of Systems Engineering at Old Dominion University (Apr 2015 - content blocked)
 Center for Intelligent Networked Systems at Stevens Institute of Technology (Apr 2015 - page timed out, presumed to no longer exist)
 System of Systems Engineering Center of Excellence (Apr 2015 - no SOSE content)

Systems engineering
Complex systems theory